Ratchanat Arunyapairot (born June 22, 1996) is a Thai professional footballer who plays as a midfielder for Thai League 1 club Bangkok United.

International Goals

U23

Honours

Club
Chainat Hornbill
 Thai League 2 (1); 2017

External links

1996 births
Living people
Association football midfielders
Ratchanat Arunyapairot
Ratchanat Arunyapairot
Ratchanat Arunyapairot
Ratchanat Arunyapairot
Ratchanat Arunyapairot
Ratchanat Arunyapairot
Ratchanat Arunyapairot